Sungai Panjang is a mukim in Sabak Bernam District, Selangor, Malaysia.

Notable residents
Dato Seri Dr Mohammad Khir Toyo former Menteri Besar (Chief Minister) of Selangor

References

Mukims of Selangor
Sabak Bernam District